The 2020–21 Los Angeles Force season was the club's second in the National Independent Soccer Association (NISA) and second overall.

Roster

Players

Staff
 Thales Peterson – Head coach
 Salvador Moran – Assistant coach
 Ramon Melin – Goalkeeper coach
 Alberto Gomez – Fitness coach
 Gabriel Torricelli Vicente – Head Physiotherapist

Friendlies

Competitions

NISA Fall Season 

On June 4, NISA announced details for the 2020 Fall Season. The eight member teams would be split into conferences, Eastern and Western, with the Force playing in the later.

The Fall regular season schedule was announced on July 31, 2020. The team played two regular season games against the rest of the Western Conference.

Standings

Results summary

Matches

Fall Playoffs

All eight NISA teams qualified for the 2020 Fall tournament, which will be hosted at Keyworth Stadium in Detroit, Michigan, beginning on September 21 ending with the final on October 2.

Group stage

Knock-Out Stage

NISA Spring Season

NISA Legends Cup 
NISA announced initial spring season plans in early February 2021, including starting the season with a tournament in Chattanooga, Tennessee with a standard regular season to follow. The tournament, now called the NISA Legends Cup, was officially announced on March 10 and is scheduled to run between April 13 and 25. All nine NISA members teams taking part in the Spring were divided into three team groups and played a round robin schedule. The highest placing group winner automatically qualified for the tournament final, while the second and third highest group winners played one-another in a semifinal to determine a second finalist.

The Force were drawn into Group 3 alongside New Amsterdam FC and tournament hosts Chattanooga FC.

Standings

Group 2 results

Matches

Regular season 
The Spring Season schedule was announced on March 18 with each association member playing eight games, four home and four away, in a single round-robin format.

Standings

Results summary

Matches

Spring Playoffs

U.S. Open Cup 

As a team playing in a recognized professional league, the Force would normally be automatically qualified for the U.S. Open Cup. However, with the 2021 edition shorted due to the COVID-19 pandemic, NISA has only been allotted 1 to 2 teams spots. On March 29, U.S. Soccer announced 2020 Fall Champion Detroit City FC as NISA's representative in the tournament.

Squad statistics

Appearances and goals 

|-
! colspan="18" style="background:#dcdcdc; text-align:center"| Goalkeepers

|-
! colspan="18" style="background:#dcdcdc; text-align:center"| Defenders

|-
! colspan="18" style="background:#dcdcdc; text-align:center"| Midfielders

|-
! colspan="18" style="background:#dcdcdc; text-align:center"| Forwards

|-
! colspan="18" style="background:#dcdcdc; text-align:center"| Left during season

|-
|}

Goal scorers

Disciplinary record

References

External links
 

Los Angeles Force
Los Angeles Force
Los Angeles Force
Los Angeles Force